Loden Foundation is a registered Civil Society Organisation in Bhutan established to support education, promote entrepreneurship amongst the young Bhutanese men and women in Bhutan and promote Bhutan tradition and culture. Its three core programmes areas include the Loden Education Initiatives, Loden Entrepreneurship Programme, and Loden Culture Programme.

Mission
To foster an enlightened and happy society through promotion of education, social entrepreneurship and Bhutan's tradition and culture.

History and beginnings

The Loden Foundation was founded on 24 May 2000 by the Bhutanese scholar Lopen Karma Phuntsho who came to study as a graduate student at Balliol College in 1997. He met Mr. Robert Miles, the head porter of the college during his course of studies and Mr. Miles offered to sponsor the school education of a young child in need. Mr. Miles extended the support because he did not finish school education in his youth due to financial circumstances. Karma found a bright girl from a low-income family in rural Bhutan for Mr. Miles to support.

Following this example, many friends of Karma showed interest to support education of children in Bhutan. Meanwhile, Karma's former school headmistress and acclaimed Bhutanese writer Kunzang Choden who was living in central Bhutan, joined him to identify children in need and distribute funds. On 24 May 2000, Karma formalised the process by founding the Loden Foundation with the help of some friends but the organisation was constituted in Bhutan in 2003. On 12 March 2010, Loden became one of the first organizations in Bhutan to register as a Civil Society Organization under the Civil Society Organizations Act of Bhutan, 2007, under the leadership of the Civil Society Organizations Authority.

Today, the main office is based in Thimphu and run by a team of 10 employee in the management team and 6 early learning centre facilitators headed by Mr. Phuntsho Namgay, with an advisory support from the governing Board of Trustees composed of 7 prominent Bhutanese citizens and 1 French citizen. The foundation is a partner of some of the world's leading non-governmental organisations such as  Prince's Youth Business International, Global Entrepreneurship Week, Entrepreneurs' Organisation, Swiss Development Corporations, Youth Business International (YBI), Helvetas Swiss Intercooperation and many more.

Loden and its logo

Tibetan/Bhutanese word Loden (བློ་ལྡན་  wylie: blo ldan) literally means "possessing intelligence". It is an epithet of the learned and wise. It is one of the names of the Buddha of Wisdom, of Padmasambhava, who brought Buddhism to the Himalayan region and a term for Bodhisattva, an altruistic being who seeks enlightenment for the whole world.

The Loden logo symbolized giving knowledge and wisdom. It is a Himalayan book in the rectangular poti format. The book on open hand symbolizes the gift of knowledge, which, the Buddha said, is the best gift.

The Loden motto is ཆོས་བདག་མེད་ཀུན་ལ་ཐོབ་ཐང་ཡོད། (chos bdag med kun la thob thang yod), a Buddhist proverb that knowledge/truth is without an owner and everyone is entitled to it.

Core programme areas

The Loden Foundation runs three main programmes:

Loden Entrepreneurship Programme
The Loden Foundation is one of the pioneers in promoting entrepreneurship in Bhutan. Aimed at benefitting Bhutanese youth, the foundation runs entrepreneurship training programmes, provides interest-free and collateral-free capital funds up to $30,000 to start businesses and provides support through its mentorship programme, monitoring scheme and resource centre. The programme was launched in 2008 in order to help promote entrepreneurship in Bhutan through the inspiration and support from Loden's longstanding friends Gerard Tardy and Anne Tardy. As thousands of young people leave schools, colleges and other educational institutes, unemployment started to grow. Civil service which was the main employer in the past is now saturated and private sector is still growing. The programme aims to help self-starters or startups in business. It also aims to help develop a responsible and sustainable entrepreneurial culture in Bhutan, inspired by the visionary and altruistic Bodhisattva ideals. As of December 2019, the foundation has trained over 5,000 aspiring and entrepreneurs, provided interest-free capital seed money to 175 (60 led by women entrepreneurs) entrepreneurial ventures which are spread across 18 districts in Bhutan and created more than 715 jobs in the market.

As part of the entrepreneurship programme, Loden also launched a special programme called 'Student Empowerment through Entrepreneurship Development' (SEED) in 14 university colleges and Technical Training Institutions (TTIs). This extended programme aims to stimulate the young minds of students at a time in their lives when they are full of imagination and open to new possibilities. It is expected to contribute towards extra curricular development of the students and inculcate entrepreneurial skills through exploring business opportunities, innovative thinking, confidence building and improvement of self-esteem and social awareness.

Loden Child Sponsorship Programme
The Loden Foundation started with this programme but many NGOs and semi-governmental organisations in the last five years have taken over the sponsorship programme. These organisations are doing a great deal more than the Loden Foundation. However, the foundation is still continuing to serve as a channel between benefactors and beneficiaries where asked. It administer funds to support the education of many young children who are going to school. As of today, a total of 150 students have benefited from the programme.

As part of the programme, the Loden Scholarship for Higher Education was established in 2012 at the post-school stage. The programme aims to provide financial support and educational guidance to students who come from poor families and rural communities with little or no access to information on higher education and may otherwise miss out on higher education despite being deserving candidates for university education.

Loden Early Learning Centres
Loden runs its Early Learning Centres for children from 4 to 6 years old in rural areas. The foundation's aim was to bring early learning to the children in rural areas as almost all early learning centres in Bhutan are concentrated in urban towns. The foundation also aspires to combine modern ECCD techniques with traditional Bhutanese upbringing practices. There are currently three early learning centres;  i) Changmari in Samtse (southern Bhutan) ii) Saling in Mongar (eastern Bhutan) iii) Ura in Bumthang (central Bhutan). The plan is to open similar ECCD centres in other rural parts of the country to provide equal opportunity for early education.

Other Loden programmes
The Loden Foundation also runs the Loden Knowledge Base, which provides resources and support for higher education and entrepreneurship. The resource centre is currently located in Dewa Khangzang building, top floor, opposite to Bhutan General Post office. The centre has a good collection of books, mostly on business and entrepreneurship and provides free access to internet. The centre also organises free seminars, workshops and discussions on a range of topics that are pertinent to the society.

References 

 The Loden Newsletter 2014
 The Loden Newsletter 2013
 The Loden Newsletter 2012
 The Loden Newsletter 2011

External links 
 Loden Foundation
 Loden Webmail
 Loden Activities
 Support Loden Foundation
 Contact Loden Foundation

Educational charities
Educational organisations based in Bhutan
Science and technology in Bhutan